The men's high jump competition at the 2018 Asian Games took place on 25 and 27 August 2018 at the Gelora Bung Karno Stadium.

Schedule
All times are Western Indonesia Time (UTC+07:00)

Records

Results
Legend
NM — No mark

Qualification
 Qualification: Qualifying performance 2.20 (Q) or at least 12 best performers (q) advance to the final.

Final

References

External links
Results

Men's high jump
2018 Men